The Sich Battalion, also called the Carpathian Sich Battalion and officially known as the 4th Sich Company of the Kyiv Regiment, is a Ukrainian special police battalion consisting of volunteers from Kyiv. The unit was formed in June 2014 by volunteers from the party Svoboda at the start of the war in Donbas.

History

Foundation and early operations 

The Sich Battalion was formed by the far-right Svoboda party in June 2014. The unit is one of several Ukrainian paramilitary volunteer battalions formed at the start of the war in Donbas in 2014, along with the Svyatyi Mykolai Battalion or Donbas Battalion, to fight against pro-Russian separatists in the Donbas region of eastern Ukraine. The Sich Battalion officially became an active unit of Ukraine's Ministry of Internal Affairs following its oath taking ceremony on 26 August 2014, and is composed of around 50 volunteers, some of whom have prior military service. Like other volunteer units, Sich Battalion members underwent two months of basic training prior to activation and began engaging separatist forces with minimal training or equipment. While the Sich Battalion was much smaller than other volunteer units, it was designed for the specific purpose of combating insurgents in the 2014 pro-Russian unrest in Ukraine.

On August 26, 2014, about 100 soldiers of the battalion took the Oath of Allegiance to the people of Ukraine, after which about 50 soldiers went to the ATO zone. Solemn farewells took place on Instytutska Street in Kyiv, where the heroes of the Heavenly Hundred died in the winter.

Together with the soldiers, seven people's deputies of the 7th convocation (2012-2014) from the Svoboda party went to the East: Yuriy Syrotiuk, Oleksiy Kaida, Oleh Osukhovsky, Oleh Gelevey, Oleksandr Myrnyi, Andriy Tyagnybok, and Oleksiy Furman. They took turns accompanying the fighters during their stay in the anti-terrorist operation zone.

On September 27, the battalion's fighters returned from the anti-terrorist operation to their place of deployment. On September 30, after a solemn ceremony, a new special unit of the battalion left for eastern Ukraine.

According to the press service of the battalion, part of the unit is located in the Donetsk region near Kurakhovo, where it performs tasks to protect the dam of Kurakhiv TPP. The battalion's base camp is located in Sloviansk, where special forces guard peace in the city and maintain law and order.

Operations as police unit 
By 2015, the Ministry of Internal Affairs banned people registered in political parties of enlisting in their units. The Sich Battalion cut their official ties with Svoboda and on 21 December 2015, the Sich Battalion was reformed into the 4th Company "Sich" of the Kyiv Regiment, as part of the Kyiv city special police, with Maxim Morozov as its commander.

Arsen Avakov, the head of Ukraine's Ministry of Internal Affairs, said that a member of the Sich Battalion was arrested after a member of the National Guard of Ukraine was killed during rioting in Kyiv on August 31, 2015.

At the start of the 2022 Russian invasion of Ukraine, the Sich Battalion fought against the Russian Kyiv offensive (2022). It later redeployed to combat the Eastern Ukraine offensive, participating in the Battle of Kharkiv (2022).

On 19 June, the commander of the Sich Battalion, Oleh Kutsyn, was killed in action fighting near Izium. The battalion is now commanded by a 58-year old, formerly retired career soldier, who uses the code name Swat. During the Ukrainian Kharkiv counteroffensive, the battalion has been on the forefront of the fighting at Izium and Lyman, both strategically important cities, to provide flanking support. On October 3rd, 2022, they seized an additional settlement to the east, secured a series of dams, and more settlements in northern Donetsk province.

See also
S14 (Ukrainian group)
Azov Battalion
Aidar Battalion
49-й окремий стрілецький батальйон «Карпатська Січ»

References and notes

Special tasks patrol police of Ukraine
History of Kyiv Oblast
Military units and formations established in 2014
2014 establishments in Ukraine
Far-right politics in Ukraine